Samuel Breck may refer to:

Samuel Breck (general) (1834–1918), Adjutant General of the U.S. Army
Samuel Breck (politician) (1771–1862), member of the U.S. House of Representatives from Pennsylvania

See also
Breck (surname)